Yu Liping (born 22 December 1993) is a Chinese rugby union player. She was selected for the China squad at for the 2020 Summer Games women's rugby sevens tournament.

References

1993 births
Living people
Chinese rugby sevens players
Female rugby sevens players
China international women's rugby sevens players
Olympic rugby sevens players of China
Rugby sevens players at the 2020 Summer Olympics
Rugby union players at the 2014 Asian Games
Rugby union players at the 2018 Asian Games
Asian Games gold medalists for China
Asian Games silver medalists for China
Asian Games medalists in rugby union
Medalists at the 2014 Asian Games
Medalists at the 2018 Asian Games